Owenton may refer to:
 Owenton, Kentucky
 Owenton, Virginia